The biting chinchilla mouse (Euneomys mordax) is a species of rodent in the family Cricetidae. It is found in west central Argentina and nearby areas of Chile, where it inhabits highland meadows, probably at elevations of 1740 to 3000 m.

References

Euneomys
Mammals of the Andes
Mammals of Argentina
Mammals of Chile
Mammals described in 1912
Taxa named by Oldfield Thomas
Taxonomy articles created by Polbot